Urmas Sutrop (born 7 June 1956) is an Estonian linguist.

He graduated from high school in 1974 and in 1984 from University of Tartu with a biology degree. The topic of his thesis was "Ardisia crispa A. DC. lehe baktersõlme siseste taimerakkude peenehitus." Near fifteen years after his first dissertation, he was awarded by University of Konstanz with a PhD in philosophy.

Ummi is probably best known for being the director of Institute of the Estonian Language, a position he held from 2000 until 2015. He is president of the Anthropology and Ethnolinguistics departments, and he is besides professor at General Linguistics department. Since 2006 he has been also professor at University of Tartu.

Bibliography
This is a partial list. Most of the texts appointed by this enumeration were written in Estonian, excepting those that are properly indicated:
"La langue estonienne", Eesti Instituut, 2002
"Eesti viipekeel", Eesti Keele Sihtasutus, 2003 (co-author)
"Estonian language", Eesti Instituut, 2004 (English)
"Die Estnische Sprache", Eesti Instituut, 2005 (German)
"Estniska", Eesti Instituut, 2007
"Viron kieli", Eesti Instituut, 2010
"Värvinimede raamat" Eesti Keele Sihtasutus, 2011 (co-author)

Articles
 "Bertrand Russell in Estonia" (English)
 "Uuenev keel"
 "Trahvidega keelt paremaks ei muuda"
 "Eesti keel pole kunagi oma ajaloos olnud nii tugev kui praegu"
 "Erakorralistest valimistest"
 "Holokaust, kurjus ja meie"
 "Wittgenstein's Tractatus 3.333 and Russell's paradox"

References

1956 births
Living people
Academic staff of the University of Tartu
20th-century linguists
Recipients of the Order of the White Star, 4th Class